Debra Ann Fischer is a professor of astronomy at Yale University researching detection and characterization of exoplanets.  She was part of the team to discover the first known multiple-planet system.

Education
Fischer received her degree from the University of Iowa in 1975, a masters of science from San Francisco State University in 1992, and her PhD from the University of California at Santa Cruz in 1998.

Research and career
Fischer has co-authored over 100 papers on dwarf stars and sub-stellar mass objects in the galactic neighborhood, including many on extrasolar planets. Her work "The Twenty Five Year Lick Planet Search" is summarized in a paper by Fischer, Marcy & Spronck 2014. She is a principal investigator with the N2K Consortium searching for exoplanets. She co-leads the planet search team with Gregory P. Laughlin and Jessi Cisewski looking for extrasolar planets.  She was the primary investigator for Chiron, the CTIO High Resolution Spectrometer.  In 2011, she started the Fiber-optic Improved Next-generation Doppler Search for Exo-Earths with the Planetary Society, an instrument that will help planet hunters find Earth-like extrasolar planets.

Honors and awards
 Elected a Legacy Fellow of the American Astronomical Society in 2020 
 2021 class of Fellows of the American Association for the Advancement of Science.
Elected Member of the National Academy of Sciences in 2021

See also
 List of stars with confirmed planets
 List of women in leadership positions on astronomical instrumentation projects

References

Living people
American women astronomers
Discoverers of exoplanets
Fellows of the American Academy of Arts and Sciences
Yale University faculty
San Francisco State University alumni
University of Iowa alumni
University of California, Santa Cruz alumni
Planetary scientists
Women planetary scientists
Fellows of the American Astronomical Society
Fellows of the American Association for the Advancement of Science
Members of the United States National Academy of Sciences
1951 births